Elena Municipality is a municipality (obshtina) in Veliko Tarnovo Province, Central-North Bulgaria, located on the northern slopes of the central Stara planina mountain in the area of the so-called Fore-Balkan. It is named after its administrative centre, the town of Elena.

The area is best known for its Bulgarian National Revival atmosphere preserved in its main town.

Geography 
Elena Municipality is situated in the Elena Balkan,  West of Varna,  South of Veliko Tarnovo and  East of Bulgaria's capital - Sofia. The city of Elena is situated in the valley of the Elena river. The rivers Veselina, Elena, Miykovska, and Bebrovska spring from the area.

Flora 
The flora and fauna are varied, with the most common trees being beech, oak, maple, linden, and hornbeams. Other trees often found in the area are elm, ash, cherries, pear, and sorrel.

Fauna 
There is a large diversity of animals living in the area. Widespread deer, Red deer, and wild boar are the most common, followed by predators like foxes, jackals and less often wolves. Smaller animals are also quite common - rabbits, partridge, snipe, and doves.

Settlements 

(towns are shown in bold):
Population (December 2009)

 Elena - Елена - 5,665
 Aplatsi - Аплаци -
 Bagalevtsi - Багалевци -
 Badevtsi - Бадевци -
 Baevtsi - Баевци -
 Bazhdari - Баждари -
 Balutsi - Балуци -
 Bebrovo - Беброво -
 Beykovtsi - Бейковци -
 Berkovtsi - Берковци -
 Blaskovtsi - Блъсковци -
 Bogdansko - Богданско -
 Boykovtsi - Бойковци -
 Bosevtsi - Босевци -
 Brezovo - Брезово -
 Brachkovtsii - Бръчковци -
 Buynovtsi - Буйновци -
 Byalkovtsi - Бялковци -
 Chavdartsi - Чавдарци -
 Chakali - Чакали -
 Chervenkovtsi - Червенковци -
 Cherni Dyal - Черни дял -
 Daveri - Давери -
 Daynovtsi - Дайновци -
 Debeli Rat - Дебели рът -
 Dobrevtsi - Добревци -
 Dolni Maryan - Долни Марян -
 Dolni Tanchevtsi - Долни Танчевци -
 Donkovtsi - Донковци -
 Draganovtsi - Драгановци -
 Dragiytsi - Драгийци -
 Dragnevtsi - Драгневци -
 Drenta - Дрента -
 Dukovtsi - Дуковци -
 Darlevtsi - Дърлевци -
 Gabarka - Габрака -
 Ganev Dol - Ганев дол -
 Glogovets - Глоговец -
 Golemani - Големани -
 Gorni Kray - Горни край -
 Gorni Tanchevtsi - Горни Танчевци -
 Gorska - Горска -
 Gramatitsi - Граматици -
 Gardevtsi - Гърдевци -
 Harvalovtsi - Харваловци -
 Hristovtsi - Христовци -
 Hanevtsi - Хъневци -
 Ivanivanovtsi - Иванивановци -
 Ignatovtsi - Игнатовци -
 Ilakov Rat - Илаков рът -
 Iliyuvtsi - Илиювци -
 Kamenari - Каменари -
 Kantari - Кантари -
 Karaivantsi - Караиванци -
 Karandili - Карандили -
 Kirevtsi - Киревци -
 Kozhlyuvtsi - Кожлювци -
 Kozya Reka - Козя река -
 Kolari - Колари -
 Konstantin - Константин -
 Kosevtsi - Косевци -
 Kostel - Костел -
 Kotutsi - Котуци -
 Krilyuvtsi - Крилювци -
 Krumchevtsi - Крумчевци -
 Lazartsi - Лазарци -
 Lesiche - Лесиче -
 Maysko - Майско -
 Marafeltsi - Марафелци -
 Marinovtsi - Мариновци -
 Maryan - Марян -
 Mahalnitsi - Махалници -
 Miykovtsi - Мийковци -
 Minevtsi - Миневци -
 Mirchovtsi - Мирчовци -
 Ruhovtsi - Руховци -

Demography 
The following table shows the change of the population during the last four decades.

Religion 
According to the latest Bulgarian census of 2011, the religious composition, among those who answered the optional question on religious identification, was the following:

See also
Provinces of Bulgaria
Municipalities of Bulgaria
List of cities and towns in Bulgaria

References

External links
 Official website 

Municipalities in Veliko Tarnovo Province